Now Deh-e Sorsoreh (also Romanized as Now Deh-e Şorşoreh and Now Deh-e Sar Sareh; also known as Naudeh and Now Deh) is a village in Karrab Rural District, in the Central District of Sabzevar County, Razavi Khorasan Province, Iran. At the 2006 census, its population was 59 in 22 families.

References 

Populated places in Sabzevar County